Deleyaman is a French-American musical band founded in Normandy, France in 2000 by the American multi-instrumentalist of Greek-Armenian origins Aret Madilian from Los Angeles, along with French singer Beatrice Valantin and French-Armenian duduk player Gerard Madilian.

The band is referenced as the first alternative rock band to have included the ancient wind instrument the duduk in their line-up. Deleyaman’s musical universe has been described as poetic, melancholic, introspective. A multi-genre band which assemble art-rock, dark wave, minimalism, post-punk and post-rock.

History

The band originally consisting of Aret Madilian, Beatrice Valantin and Gerard Madilian released their debut album 00/1, in September 2001 on Editions Nech Records, an independent world music label based in Paris.

The following albums entitled Second (2003) and 3 (2006) received wider recognition and were also to be released on the French label Editions Nech Records. Two tracks from Second "Battlefield" and "Black Rainbow", were chosen by the French actress and film director Fanny Ardant for the soundtrack of her 2017 film  starring Gerard Depardieu and Emmanuelle Seigner.

In 2009 Deleyaman released the first of their two part album Fourth, part one. Fourth, part two was released in 2011. The band’s sixth album The Edge, was released July 4, 2014. The German weekly Der Spiegel has referenced the album on "Die wichtigste Musik der Woche" (The most important music of the week) section.

The following album The lover, The stars & The citadel, was released on November 18, 2016. It includes Brendan Perry of Dead Can Dance guesting as instrumentalist on two of the album's tracks.

In 2017, Deleyaman’s cover version of "Bir sana Bir de Bana", the Turkish song originally written by the psychedelic-oriental dub band Baba Zula appeared in BaBa ZuLa’s 20th anniversary album XX released in January 2017 on Glitterhouse Records.

In October 2018, Deleyaman & Jules Maxwell toured Ireland and the UK playing in Limerick, Galway, Lisdoonvarna, Carlow, Dublin, Dundalk and Portaferry and guesting on BBC Radio Ulster’s John Toal show.

A new album Sentinel, including contributions from Brendan Perry and Jules Maxwell, was released on January 17, 2020. They collaborated with French actress Fanny Ardant for a night of poetry and music in 2021  and 2022.

Band members

Current members
 Aret Madilian – guitar, bass, keyboards, vocals, percussions
 Beatrice Valantin – vocals, keyboards
 Guillaume Leprevost – bass, guitar
 Artyom Minasyan – duduk, pku, blul
 Gerard Madilian – duduk

Former members
 Mia Bjorlingsson – drums
 Ara Duzian – guitar

Discography

References

External links
 
 Deleyaman on Discogs

Musical groups established in 2000
French world music groups
French dark wave musical groups
French rock music groups
French indie rock groups
French post-rock groups